The Second Holder Ministry was the 42nd Ministry of the Government of South Australia, led by Frederick Holder. It commenced on 8 December 1899, following the defeat of the seven-day Solomon Ministry. It was succeeded by the Jenkins Ministry on 15 May 1901, following Holder's retirement from state politics to enter federal politics, and his replacement as leader of the liberal faction in parliament by his Chief Secretary, John Jenkins.

Notes

 Lee Batchelor, the Minister for Education and Agriculture, was a member of the United Labor Party. He was the first Labor member in Australia to serve in a non-Labor Cabinet, with the support of his party.

References

Holder 2